Annetta R. Chipp ( Biggs; after first marriage, Klingensmith; after second marriage, Chipp; May 2, 1866 – March 25, 1961) was an American temperance leader and prison evangelist. She served as president of the South Idaho Woman's Christian Temperance Union (W.C.T.U.).

Early life and education
Annetta Rebecca Biggs was born at Montpelier, Indiana, May 2, 1866. Her parents were George Washington Biggs (1839-1929) and Margaret (Baldwin) Biggs (1837-1916). Annetta had three sisters and a brother: Viola, Mildred, Carrie, and George.

Almost simultaneously with the beginning of her education in the public schools of Montpelier, she developed an interest for temperance reform through a tragedy wrought by alcoholism in one of the neighboring households, where a father and his son both died of delirium tremens in the same night. The Murphy movement, introduced into the community shortly afterward, afforded children as well as adults the opportunity for organized action, and the young schoolgirl became one of the leaders. Removing with her parents to LeRoy, Michigan, at the age of 14, Miss Biggs there became a member of the Independent Order of Good Templars.

Career
In Boise, Idaho, her active participation in the work of the W.C.T.U. and effective service in various official positions led to her selection as president of the South Idaho W.C.T.U. in 1910, a position which she held for six years, until failing health compelled her retirement to less exacting duties.

For some years thereafter, she served as prison evangelist, holding services in the jails and various other State institutions. By appointment of the governor of the State, she was a delegate to the National Prison Congress. For years, Mr. and Mrs. Chipp opened their home to discharged prisoners, assisting them in finding employment and in reestablishing themselves in life. The home was also opened twice a week to classes of Japanese, where instruction was given in English branches, temperance, and U.S. ways of life.

In addition to the W.C.T.U., Chipp was a member of the First Baptist Church, YWCA, Idaho State Historical Society, and the Daughters of the American Revolution.

Personal life
In 1886, at LeRoy, Michigan, she married Harry Elmer Klingensmith (1862-1896). Widowed in 1896, she then removed with her three children, Gladys, Lloyd, and Charles, to live with her mother at Arlington, Oregon.

In 1899, she married Warren Sydney Chipp (1867-1956) and they settled in Boise, Idaho in 1902, where she lived the remainder of her life. Their children were, Warren, Margaret, and Charles.

Annetta Rebecca Chipp died in Boise, Idaho, March 25, 1961.

Notes

References

1866 births
1961 deaths
American temperance activists
Woman's Christian Temperance Union people
Prison reformers
People from Blackford County, Indiana
People from Boise, Idaho
Activists from Idaho
Daughters of the American Revolution people